Daniel Hochhauser (born 18 July 1957) is a British oncologist, and Kathleen Ferrier Professor of Medical Oncology at University College London.

Early life
Daniel Hochhauser was born on 18 July 1957, the son of the impresarios Lilian and Victor Hochhauser. He is also a direct descendant of famed Judaic scholar the Chatam Sofer.

He earned a bachelor's degree from the University of Cambridge in 1979, an MBBS in Medicine from the Royal Free University College Medical School in 1983, an MRCP from the Royal College of Physicians in 1986, and a DPhil from the University of Oxford in 1993.

Career
Hochhauser completed his specialist training at the Memorial Sloan-Kettering Cancer Center in New York City, where he worked as a medical oncology fellow before his appointment as a consultant in 1996.

Publications 
Hochhauser's major clinical interest is in gastrointestinal medical oncology and his research is focused on development of early phase clinical trials.

References

1957 births
Living people
British oncologists
Alumni of the University of Cambridge
Alumni of the University of Oxford
British Jews
British people of Slovak-Jewish descent
British people of Russian-Jewish descent
 British expatriates in the United States